Zooey Zephyr is an American politician and university administrator, who is the Representative for the 100th district of the Montana House of Representatives. She was elected in the 2022 Montana House of Representatives election, making her the first openly transgender person to be elected to the state legislature in Montana. She was sworn in as a Representative on January 2, 2023.

References

External links
 

1989 births
Living people
Democratic Party members of the Montana House of Representatives
Transgender politicians
LGBT state legislators in Montana
Politicians from Billings, Montana
21st-century American politicians
21st-century American women politicians
University of Washington alumni
Politicians from Missoula, Montana